Sir Ba U (26 May 1887 – 9 November 1963), was a Burmese politician and lawyer. He served as Chief Justice of the Supreme Court of Burma from 1948 to 1952, and the second president of Burma from 16 March 1952 to 13 March 1957.

Born
He was born on 26 May 1887 at Pathein in the Irrawaddy delta, son of U Poe Hla and Daw Nyunt.

Education 
He passed university entry class from Rangoon Government High School. In 1907 he attended the University of Cambridge to study law and graduated in 1912. In the early 1950s, he was awarded an Honorary Doctorate of Letters at the University of Rangoon.

Career 
He was employed as a lawyer in Yangon between 1913 and 1921. In 1921 he became a district judge. In 1932, he was appointed to the High Court of Judicature at Rangoon as a judge. He was Chief Justice of the Supreme Court of Burma from 1948 to 1952. He was knighted in 1947. He was a member of the Anti-Fascist People's Freedom League. Ba U served as a judge under British, Japanese and Burmese rule. He wrote an autobiography, Ba, My Burma: The Autobiography of a President (New York: Taplinger, 1958). It contains little in the way of a discussion of public issues.

Family 
In 1913 he married Daw Nyein, daughter of retired district judge Aung Zan, and they had two sons. Daw Nyein died in 1922. In 1923 he married Daw Aye, daughter of governor Soe Pe. With her he had two sons and a daughter. Daw Aye died in 1941. He died on 9 November 1963.

References 

1963 deaths
Presidents of Myanmar
1887 births
Alumni of the University of Cambridge
Anti-Fascist People's Freedom League politicians
Burmese judges
People from Ayeyarwady Region
British Burma judges
Burmese knights
Knights Bachelor
Burmese collaborators with Imperial Japan